Shawano County (pronounced SHAW-no) (originally Shawanaw County) is a county located in the U.S. state of Wisconsin. As of the 2020 census, the population was 40,881. Its county seat is Shawano.

Shawano County is included in the Shawano, WI Micropolitan Statistical Area, which is also included in the Green Bay-Shawano, WI Combined Statistical Area.

History
Its name is from a modified Ojibwa term meaning "southern"; it was the southern boundary of the Ojibwa nation. A Menominee chief named Sawanoh led a band that lived in the area. Many citizens of Shawano believe the lake, county, and city (Town of Shawanaw founded 1853 and changed to Shawano in 1856), were named after Chief Sawanoh.  A historical marker placed in 1958 near the lake along Highway 22 states the lake was named as the southern boundary of Chippewa (Ojibwe) territory.

Various historical recordings of the spelling of Shawano include Sawanoh, Shawanaw, Sharuno, Shabin, Savannah, and Savanah. This shows the influence of French, German, and English translation (v's, w's, and b's sounding very similar and thus being recorded incorrectly at times). Similar differences in spelling have been seen in the Mahican/Mahikan/Maikens tribe or Mohecan/Morhican/Mohican tribe, all referring to the same Algonquian-speaking people.

The federally recognized Stockbridge-Munsee Community (made up of Algonquian-speaking  Mahican and Lenape), whose ancestors traditionally lived in the East along the Hudson River Valley, is located in Shawano County. Their reservation encompasses the towns of Bartelme and Red Springs.

The county was created as a separate county in 1853 under the name Shawanaw County. The county, unlike the city, retained the old spelling until 1864.

From the mid-nineteenth century on, the county was settled by European Americans, including many German, and later, Polish immigrants. They developed the county for agriculture. Before that, French-Canadian and British fur traders traveled widely through the area, trading with the Chippewa and other Native American peoples of the region.

The first non-Indian credited with exploring the region where Shawano is now located is Samuel Farnsworth.  He paddled up the Wolf River in 1843 with a few men to scout the area for logging the vast forests.  A small Menominee village was located along the Shawano lake Channel when their party arrived, and the Indians were friendly and cooperative.  Charles Wescott and the Farnsworth group then set up a sawmill where the Channel meets the Wolf River.

Captain William Powell, an officer of the Black Hawk War, established a trading post on the Wolf River about two miles from the village in 1844.  He had been an interpreter for the government when the treaties were signed allowing white people to settle this area of Wisconsin.
	
E. F. Sawyer platted a village near Powell's trading post in 1854 but public favor clung to the region adjacent to the old mill property and it was decided by popular vote to locate the county seat at Shawanaw, which was the name of the newly formed county.
	
The county, which was organized in 1853, was formed from areas of Oconto and Outagamie Counties.  Forty-seven votes were cast and Elias Murray, Charles D Wescott and Elisha Alexander were elected supervisors.  At that time there were 254 registered inhabitants, but only the men were allowed to vote.
	
When the county was first organized the name was spelled Shawanaw, taken from the Indian Sha-wa-Nah-Pay-Sa which meant “lake to the south” in Menominee and Chippewa.  The spelling was changed in 1864 to its present Shawano, with three townships: Richmond, Waukechon and Shawano.  Later others were added, making twenty-five townships.
	
In 1860 the first school house was erected in the county and Orlin Andrews was employed as its teacher.  In 1898 there were 108 public schools in the county with 124 teachers.
	
A courthouse was erected on Main Street in 1857 and was replaced in 1879–80 at a cost of $17,000.00. The County Board authorized a new courthouse and jail in June 1953.
	
The earliest settlers who came to Shawano County consisted mostly of people from the New England States, Canada, and a few from British Columbia.  A large influx of Bohemians settled in the Leopolis area and near Powell's Trading Post in the area about two miles from the city on Highway K.  Norwegians settled in the area around Wittenberg, Lessor, Lunds and Navarino.  Germans have been very predominate in the entire county, with 4,524 of the 27,475 inhabitants in 1900 born in Germany.

Geography

Adjacent counties

 Menominee County - north
 Oconto County - east
 Brown County - southeast
 Outagamie County - south
 Waupaca County - south
 Portage County - southwest
 Marathon County - west
 Langlade County - northwest

Major highways

  U.S. Highway 45
  Highway 22 (Wisconsin)
  Highway 29 (Wisconsin)
  Highway 32 (Wisconsin)
  Highway 47 (Wisconsin)
  Highway 52 (Wisconsin)
  Highway 55 (Wisconsin)
  Highway 110 (Wisconsin)
  Highway 117 (Wisconsin)
  Highway 153 (Wisconsin)
  Highway 156 (Wisconsin)
  Highway 160 (Wisconsin)
  Highway 187 (Wisconsin)

Railroads
Watco

Buses
List of intercity bus stops in Wisconsin

Airport
The city and county jointly operate the Shawano Municipal Airport (KEZS) which is located on Shawano Lake.

Demographics

2020 census
Note: the US Census treats Hispanic/Latino as an ethnic category. This table excludes Latinos from the racial categories and assigns them to a separate category. Hispanics/Latinos can be of any race. 

As of the 2020 United States census, there were 40,881 people, 17,153 households, and 11,265 families residing in the county. The racial makeup of the county was 84.8% White, 8.5% Native American, 0.4% Asian, 0.3% Black or African American, 1.2% from other races, and 4.8% from two or more races. Ethnically, the population was 2.9% Hispanic or Latino of any race.

2000 census
As of the census of 2000, there were 40,664 people, 15,815 households, and 11,149 families residing in the county. The population density was 46 people per square mile (18/km2). There were 18,317 housing units at an average density of 20 per square mile (8/km2). The racial makeup of the county was 91.61% White, 0.22% Black or African American, 6.26% Native American, 0.33% Asian, 0.04% Pacific Islander, 0.31% from other races, and 1.22% from two or more races. 1.00% of the population were Hispanic or Latino of any race. 54.9% were of German and 8.1% Polish ancestry.

There were 15,815 households, out of which 31.50% had children under the age of 18 living with them, 58.30% were married couples living together, 8.00% had a female householder with no husband present, and 29.50% were non-families. 24.90% of all households were made up of individuals, and 12.10% had someone living alone who was 65 years of age or older. The average household size was 2.51 and the average family size was 3.00.

In the county, the population was spread out, with 25.70% under the age of 18, 6.90% from 18 to 24, 27.50% from 25 to 44, 23.10% from 45 to 64, and 16.80% who were 65 years of age or older. The median age was 38 years. For every 100 females there were 99.80 males. For every 100 females age 18 and over, there were 97.60 males.

In 2017, there were 465 births, giving a general fertility rate of 69.8 births per 1000 women aged 15–44, the 18th highest rate out of all 72 Wisconsin counties. Additionally, there were 16 reported induced abortions performed on women of Shawano County residence in 2017.

Communities

Cities
 Marion (mostly in Waupaca County)
 Shawano (county seat)

Villages

 Aniwa
 Birnamwood (partly in Marathon County)
 Bonduel
 Bowler
 Cecil
 Eland
 Gresham
 Mattoon
 Pulaski (mostly in Brown County and Oconto County)
 Tigerton
 Wittenberg

Towns

 Almon
 Angelica
 Aniwa
 Bartelme
 Belle Plaine
 Birnamwood
 Fairbanks
 Germania
 Grant
 Green Valley
 Hartland
 Herman
 Hutchins
 Lessor
 Maple Grove
 Morris
 Navarino
 Pella
 Red Springs
 Richmond
 Seneca
 Washington
 Waukechon
 Wescott
 Wittenberg

Census-designated places

 Angelica
 Caroline
 Green Valley
 Krakow
 Leopolis
 Middle Village (partial)
 Navarino
 Paac Ciinak
 Pella
 Pulcifer
 Thornton
 Tilleda

Unincorporated communities

 Adams Beach
 Advance
 Almon
 Belle Plaine
 Briarton
 Five Corners
 Frazer Corners
 Hofa Park
 Hunting
 Landstad
 Laney
 Lunds
 Lyndhurst
 Morgan
 Pittsfield (partial)
 Red River
 Regina
 Rose Lawn
 Shepley
 Slab City
 Split Rock
 Whitcomb
 Zachow

Politics
In presidential elections, Shawano County is strongly Republican, and has voted Democratic on three occasions since 1940, each time by margins of less than four percent.

See also
 National Register of Historic Places listings in Shawano County, Wisconsin

References

Further reading
 Commemorative Biographical Record of the Upper Wisconsin Counties of Waupaca, Portage, Wood, Marathon, Lincoln, Oneida, Vilas, Langlade and Shawano. Chicago: J. H. Beers, 1895.

External links
 Shawano County
 Shawano County map from the Wisconsin Department of Transportation
 Shawano Country Tourism
 Shawano County Barns Adorned With Colorful Barn Quilts  Video produced by PBS Wisconsin

 
1861 establishments in Wisconsin
Populated places established in 1861